Sofía Álvarez Caicedo (23 May 1913 – 30 April 1985) was a Colombian-Mexican actress and singer. She is best remembered for her work in the Golden Age of Mexican cinema.

Life and career
Born and raised in Colombia, she moved with her family to Mexico in 1928. Her film debut was a small part, in the role of a prostitute in Santa (1930), the first talkie of Mexican cinema. Popularly known as the lady of the long braids, she enjoyed popularity during the 1930s and 1940s as an actress and singer. Subsequently, she performed with Mario Moreno Cantinflas in the popular film Ahí está el detalle (1940). In the 1940s, Álvarez is characterized by her interpretation of elegant ladies in films like El sombrero de tres picos and México de mis recuerdos (1943). She performed with the popular Pedro Infante in three films: Si me han de matar mañana (1946), La barca de oro (1947) and Soy charro de Rancho Grande (1947). One of her most celebrated films was La Reina de la Opereta (1945). In 1950 she left the cinema to continue as a radio singer. She returned to the cinema between 1957 and 1966, when she retired from the scenes. Her last film was El Gángster (1965), with Arturo de Córdova. She was noted for her excellent voice also that delicate features that printed her characters.

Selected filmography
 Santa (1930)
 Martín Garatuza (1935)
 Here's the Point (1940)
 Flor de fango (1941)
 El sombrero de tres picos (1943)
 My Memories of Mexico (1944)
 Diario de una mujer (1944)
 La Reina de la Opereta (1945)
 Si me han de matar mañana (1946)
 La barca de oro (1947)
 Soy charro de Rancho Grande (1947)
 Angels of the Arrabal (1949)
 El Gángster (1965)

References

Bibliography

External links

1913 births
1985 deaths
20th-century Mexican actresses
Actresses from Bogotá
Singers from Bogotá
Colombian emigrants to Mexico
20th-century Mexican women singers